Ichi the Killer is a 2001 Japanese comedy horror action-crime film directed by Takashi Miike, written by Sakichi Sato, based on Hideo Yamamoto's manga series of the same name, and starring Tadanobu Asano and Nao Omori. Omori portrays the title character, a psychologically damaged man who is manipulated into assaulting or killing rival faction members of feuding yakuza gangs while being pursued by a sadomasochistic enforcer (Asano).

The film has garnered controversy due to its graphic depictions of violence and cruelty, and has been banned in several countries.

Plot 
Ichi is on a balcony, masturbating while spying on a pimp raping and assaulting a prostitute. When the pimp discovers him, he flees.

A sadistic yakuza boss named Anjo has been massacred. A cleaning crew run by Jijii removes all traces of Anjo's blood and entrails, and credits Ichi for the slaughter. Later, Kakihara, Anjo's sadomasochistic high-ranking enforcer, and other crime lords visit the spotless apartment, concluding that Anjo fled town with the prostitute and ¥3 million of the gang's money. Kakihara visits an underworld night club with other gang members. He tells Anjo's girlfriend, an English-speaking Chinese prostitute named Karen, that Anjo must still be alive, perhaps kidnapped by a rival gang. Jijii feeds Kakihara rumors that Suzuki, a member of the rival Funaki clan, has kidnapped Anjo. Kakihara captures Suzuki and tortures him, but when Suzuki turns out to be innocent, Kakihara slices off the end of his own tongue and offers it to Suzuki's boss as penance.

Kakihara and other gang members capture Kano, a drug-addled member of the cleaning crew. He reveals that although he helped clean up the murder scene, it was Ichi who killed Anjo, and that Kakihara has now been targeted. Later, Ichi returns to the pimp's balcony to again watch him brutalize Sailor, a prostitute whom Ichi is a regular patron of. A crying Ichi intervenes, killing the pimp and telling Sailor that he will now be the one to assault her. When Sailor tries to defend herself, Ichi reflexively kills her.

At Suzuki's prompting, Kakihara is kicked out of the syndicate, but the entire Anjo gang defects with him. Suzuki then promises Jijii a million yen to "squash" Kakihara. Jijii, it is revealed, is secretly orchestrating events in order to pit yakuza clans against one another, with the help of Ichi. Though normally unassuming and cowardly, Ichi becomes homicidal and sexually aroused when enraged. Jijii is able to manipulate Ichi by implanting several false memories—a high school rape in particular—and uses Ichi as a killing machine.

One evening, Ichi kicks one of three bullies attacking a boy named Takeshi. Takeshi is the son of Kaneko, one of Kakihara's henchmen. Jijii incites Ichi to enter an apartment containing several members of the old Anjo gang, and slaughter them all. Afterward, Ichi sees Takeshi, who thanks him for the earlier protection. Kaneko finds a brothel-keeper assaulting Ichi in an alley and, remembering his own long-ago rescue by a member of the Anjo gang, helps Ichi out.

Kakihara enlists the help of corrupt twin police detectives, Jirō and Saburō, to find Myu-Myu, a prostitute connected with Ryu Long, a member of Jijii's gang. When Jirō fails to get information from her through torture, Saburō tracks Long down. Though Long outruns the brothers, Kakihara captures him so the twins can torture him for leads to Jijii. Meanwhile, Jijii has Karen seduce Ichi by pretending to be the raped woman from his false memory. When Ichi becomes confused by Karen's claims that she desired for him to rape and assault her, he kills her. Jijii informs Kakihara that Ichi is coming to kill him but is spotted by Takayama, one of Kakihara's men. After a pursuit, Jijii, who is surprisingly muscular, disarms Takayama and kills him. Ichi then arrives at Kakihara's base, where he kills Jirō and Saburō.

Kaneko, Kakihara and Ichi chase each other to a rooftop. Due to Jijii's psychological manipulation, Ichi believes that Kaneko is his brother and confronts him. Kaneko shoots Ichi's leg, and Ichi slits Kaneko's throat in front of Takeshi. Takeshi attacks Ichi as he lies on the roof crying. Believing Ichi to be too unstable to hurt him, Kakihara inserts his skewers into his ears to drown out Ichi's cries. He suddenly sees that Ichi has decapitated Takeshi. Ichi charges Kakihara, embedding a bladed boot into his forehead. Kakihara falls from the roof to his death. However, when Jijii finds him, Kakihara has no wound in his head; he hallucinated both Takeshi's murder and Ichi's attack as he jumped to his death while Ichi cried.

Years later, Jijii's corpse hangs from a tree in a park. A young man resembling an older Takeshi leaves the park with a group of schoolchildren.

Cast

Production
The soundtrack was written and produced by Karera Musication, a side project of the Japanese band Boredoms, under the direction of ex-guitarist Seiichi Yamamoto and percussionist/band leader Yoshimi P-We.

Themes
Film journalist Tom Mes has suggested that the film is in fact a very sophisticated assessment of violence and its relation to the media and implicating the audience. He writes that "It's a paradox, but Ichi the Killer, a film that sets new boundaries in the portrayal of violence and bloodshed, takes a strongly critical stance towards the portrayal and the consumption of the violent image. However, it does so without ever taking a moral stance towards either the portrayal or the consumption, thus circumventing any accusations of hypocrisy on the part of the director. Miike does not moralise or chastise, but provokes the audience into questioning their own attitudes towards viewing images of violence. He steers them into a direction but leaves it up to them to draw their own conclusion".

Mes is also very critical of the edits made to the film. He argues that "The film as a whole is a completely cohesive unity, in that all of its parts are absolutely crucial to the functioning of the whole. Any attempt at censorship or toning down the violence will have the opposite effect and will in fact make the film more exploitative and thereby undermine its critical stance. Excising scenes of violence, particularly the 'painful' scenes, will harm the symbiosis between the 'playful' and the 'painful' violence, which forms the basis for Miike's critical approach".

Release
The film had its world premiere in the Midnight Madness section at the 2001 Toronto International Film Festival on 14 September 2001. It was released in Japan on 22 December 2001.

As a publicity gimmick, barf bags were received by viewers out at the Toronto International Film Festival (TIFF) to those attending the midnight screening of this movie. Similar bags were given during the Stockholm International Film Festival. Reportedly, watching this film caused one viewer to throw up and another to faint. The British Board of Film Classification refused the release of the uncut film in the United Kingdom, citing "scenes of mutilated, raped or savagely beaten women or of sexual pleasure from violence." A compulsory cut of three minutes and fifteen seconds of content was required for the film's release; the cut version was passed with an 18 certificate. For the Hong Kong release, sixteen minutes and 59 seconds were cut. The movie has been banned outright in Norway and Malaysia, and banned for distribution in Germany.

In 2018, a digital restoration of the film was made by L'Immagine Ritrovata. The first public screening was at the HKIFF42.

Reception
On Rotten Tomatoes, the film holds an approval rating of 65% based on 40 reviews, with a weighted average rating of 6.20/10. The website's critical consensus reads, "Ichi The Killer is a thoroughly shocking gorefest that will surely entertain those with strong stomachs and a penchant for brutal violence." Metacritic reports a score of 55 out of 100 based on 10 critics, indicating "mixed or average reviews".

Some critics praised Miike's stylish and narrative approach. Tanner Tafelski of The Village Voice noted, "Miike layers a blood-stained commentary on a toxic world in which men offer protection to men but really end up dooming them to exist within a spasmodic, shambolic, and hypermasculine sphere of violence."

Other critics were more critical of the film's extreme violence and found the film inconsistent. Dennis Harvey said for Variety, "Even hardy gonzo-cinema auds will likely find the hectic pace overstimulating to the point of numbed-out tedium."

Prequel
The film was followed by a prequel, 1-Ichi. Nao Omori reprises his role in the prequel, playing a younger version of Ichi.

See also 
 Prostitution in Japan

References

External links
 
 

 
2001 films
2000s crime action films
2000s crime drama films
2000s Japanese-language films
Films about rape
Films directed by Takashi Miike
Tokyo Shock
Yakuza films
Japanese splatter films
Live-action films based on manga
Obscenity controversies in film
Film censorship in Canada
Film censorship in the United Kingdom
Film censorship in Norway
Film censorship in Malaysia
Film controversies in Canada
Film controversies in the United Kingdom
Film controversies in Norway
Film controversies in Malaysia
BDSM in films
2001 drama films
2000s Japanese films